The Empire of Future is the debut studio album released by Silent Force.

Track listing
All songs written by Alex Beyrodt and D.C. Cooper, except when noted.
 "The Beginning" – 2:58
 "Live for the Day" – 5:44
 "Empire of Future" – 6:22
 "Saints And Sinners" – 4:59
 "Tell Me Why" – 4:44
 "New Experiment" – 6:56
 "Six Past The Hour" – 4:44 (Beyrodt, Michael Bormann, Cooper)
 "Broken Wings" – 5:04 (Beyrodt, Cooper, André Hilgers)
 "We Must Remain" – 5:11
 "I'll Be There" - 5:57 (Beyrodt, Cooper, Günter Werno)
 "See Beyond" - 5:34 (Japanese bonus track) (Beyrodt, Hilgers, Cooper)
 "Saints And Sinners (Acoustic)" - 5:46 (2007 remastered release)

Personnel
D.C. Cooper - vocals
Alex Beyrodt - guitars
Thorsten Fleisch - bass
Torsten Röhre - keyboards
André Hilgers - drums

Guest musicians
Frank Rössler - keyboards
Günther Werno - piano on track 10
David Readman - backing vocals
Maria Kern - backing vocals
Michael Müller - additional bass

Production
Produced by Alex Beyrodt and Dennis Ward (musician) at House of Music Studio and House Of Audio
Mixed by Alex Beyrodt and Achim Köhler at House of Music Studio
Track 10 produced by Dennis Ward and D.C. Cooper

2000 debut albums